John Aston (20 November 1882 – 9 January 1951) was an Irish cricketer. He was a right-handed batsman and right-arm medium pace bowler.

He made his debut for the Gentlemen of Ireland on their tour of North America in 1909, playing against a team representing New York City. He then played two first-class matches against Philadelphia on the same tour. He later played two first-class matches for Ireland in 1925, one against Scotland and the other against Wales in addition to a match against the MCC at Lord's. His brother, Herbert Aston, was also a first-class cricketer and played international rugby union.

References
CricketEurope Stats Zone profile

1882 births
1951 deaths
Irish cricketers
Cricketers from County Dublin
Gentlemen of Ireland cricketers
People educated at Wesley College, Dublin